Maksar-e Vosta (also Romanized as Maksar-e Vostá; also known as Maksar-e Mīānī) is a village in Jarahi Rural District, in the Central District of Mahshahr County, Khuzestan Province, Iran. At the 2006 census, its population was 115, in 20 families.

References 

Populated places in Mahshahr County